Pixomondo (PXO) is an Academy and Emmy award-winning international visual effects and virtual production company with studios in Los Angeles, Frankfurt, Stuttgart, Vancouver, Toronto, Montreal, and London. The company provides virtual production and visual effects for feature films, television, and commercials. As of 2019, PXO employs over 655 people worldwide.

History 
PXO was founded in Pfungstadt, Germany as a design studio in 2001 by Thilo Kuther. The company began its work creating video installations and 3D-animations for high-end corporate clients such as Porsche and Bertelsmann. By the end of 2003, PXO consisted of its one office in Pfungstadt and 40 employees. In 2005, the company first began working in the entertainment business by producing the visual effects for the German television film Atlantropa - Der Traum vom neuen Kontinent. In 2005, a second location, specializing in feature films, opened in Ludwigsburg, Germany. At this location, the company produced nearly all the visual effects for the international feature film The Red Baron, which was released in 2008, and earned PXO its first international recognition. In the same year, the first studio abroad opened in London. In 2007 and 2008, studios were opened in Frankfurt and Los Angeles, respectively. Also in 2008, Pixomondo was commissioned by director Roland Emmerich to produce over 100 complete CG-environments for his feature film 2012. PXO's first offices in Asia, specifically in Shanghai and Beijing, were opened in 2009. In 2011, the company expanded its London office and added two studios in Munich and Hamburg, as well as one in Toronto in 2011.

PXO closed its London office in February 2013. In 2013, PXO closed its Shanghai and Berlin offices, naming restructuring processes as a reason for the closures. In 2014, the office in Shanghai reopened. In 2018, Mayfair Equity Partners completed a majority investment in PXO. The deal valued PXO at $65 million. Less than a year later, Jonny Slow was appointed as global CEO. In early 2019, PXO opened its Montreal office. In June 2021 PXO closed its Beijing and Shanghai offices and by September had announced a new London division that will over virtual production services.

In October 2022, Sony Pictures Entertainment announced the acquisition of Pixomondo.

Virtual production
In September 2020, PXO announced it began construction on a virtual production studio in Toronto, Canada, with Mayfair backing the new venture with a significant new financial commitment. PXO assembled a team of technical partners for the studio that included Epic Games' Unreal Engine, LED manufacturer ROE Visual, Nvidia, and Brompton Technology among others. In January 2021, the inaugural project to shoot on the virtual production stage was Star Trek: Discovery (Season Four) followed by the spin-off series Star Trek: Strange New Worlds. In July 2021, PXO, in a partnership with Canadian TV and film equipment rental business William F. White International, opened a second virtual production studio in Toronto. Known as Stage 6, it is designed for shorter duration shoots, including commercials and music videos. In November 2021, Netflix announced it partnered with PXO on a custom-built virtual production facility in Vancouver for its live-action adaptation of Avatar: The Last Airbender. In 2022, the Vancouver stage was named the Largest LED Stage by Guinness World Records and is featured in the “Guinness World Records 2023” print edition. “When it comes to world records in the realm of visual and special effects, we're faced with a dazzling array of new technological wonders to consider,” commented Craig Glenday, Editor-in-Chief, Guinness World Records. “As fans of this latest generation of effects-led movies and TV shows, it's exciting to be able to recognize a space as magical as the Pixomondo and William F. White International stage. It's almost literally a dream factory where anything can be conjured up, from flying dragons to dramatic moonscapes.

Academy Award
On February 26, 2012, PXO won the Academy Award for Best Visual Effects for its work on the film Hugo. The award was presented to Alex Henning and Ben Grossmann, who were the supervisors of the project. With 854 scenes that have a running time of about 62 minutes in the final film, PXO produced about 94% of the film's visual effects. In 2014, the company earned its second Academy Award for Best Visual Effects nomination for its work on Star Trek Into Darkness.

Star Trek franchise
After a successful collaboration on Star Trek Into Darkness, PXO continued to work on the franchise, beginning with Star Trek: Discovery, followed by Star Trek: Short Treks and Star Trek: Picard. The company earned a VFX Emmy nomination for its work on Season 2 of Discovery. PXO also provided the animation for Short Treks''' "The Girl Who Made the Stars" and "Ephraim and Dot," both of which premiered on December 12, 2019. They marked a historic return to animation for Star Trek, which had not delved into the world of animation since the 1973-1974 The Animated Series. PXO took the franchise in a new direction when Discovery Season 4 adopted virtual production for the first time in the franchise's history. Strange New Worlds is the first new series to use virtual production from its inception.

Game of Thrones

PXO was brought on to the HBO television series Game of Thrones in Season 2 and remained through the final season.  PXO VFX Supervisor Sven Martin and his team worked closely with the show's VFX group. Martin told Forbes Magazine that they wanted to depict the dragons as "living animals with just enough expressions to understand their feelings…similar to the emotional connection with pets." "We started with a base model, which was established in season 1, but we went for a darker, grittier approach," Martin told Entertainment Weekly. "We did a lot of redesign, made them more spiky, even in the baby state. It was a little bit of a relaunch, but we still kept it believable for the audience."

The key to grounding these mythical creatures, which do not exist in real life, was to give Drogon, Rhaegal, and Viserion real-world animal counterparts the audience could identify with. "The dragons were always in close contact with the actors," says Martin. "And we were shooting outside on real locations. So everything is real and not meant to be a fantasy. We wanted to transfer that." Studying bird and bat anatomies influenced the dragons' wingspan design. The PXO team even dissected a supermarket chicken to get a sense of how the wings could move. Observing geese on the ground playing with their own wings was later emulated when the dragons were shown sitting down at ease. Color patterns were gleaned from frogs and cheetahs, while crocodiles, lizards, and other reptiles were used for skin structure.

Martin's team met with the show's VFX Supervisor Joe Bauer at the start of each season to discuss new design elements, as the dragons were maturing and growing. For example, they became more guard dog-like as they grew into their roles as Dany's guards. When they got angry or wanted to threaten the enemy, gills popped out of their necks.  "That idea came from the fruit lizard, which does exactly the same thing, just in a different direction," Martin told Entertainment Weekly. When Danny started riding Drogon, more spikes were added to him so she'd have something to hold on to.

PXO is currently working on the Game of Thrones prequel, House of the Dragon.Roland Emmerich
PXO has a longstanding relationship with filmmaker Roland Emmerich, having first worked together on 2012, followed by Independence Day: Resurgence, the World War II drama Midway (which PXO co-produced), Moonfall and the upcoming Emmerich-produced feature film adaptation of Mozart's The Magic Flute.Midway was among 20 films shortlisted in the Visual Effects category for the 92nd Academy Awards®. When Emmerich received the 2019 Visionary VES Award from the Visual Effects Society at its 18th annual awards ceremony, PXO founder Thilo Kuther was among those he acknowledged from the podium.

See

On November 1, 2019, PXO was part of Apple TV+'s historic launch by providing the VFX for two series, including See and For All Mankind. The inaugural episode of See, earned PXO a VES Award nomination for Outstanding Supporting Visual Effects in a Photoreal Episode which included the company's creation of the infamous rockwall sequence. The following season of See saw PXO receive a nomination in the same category, this time for the season finale episode. See won, beating out such shows as The Handmaid's Tale and Squid Game among others. The season finale episode is currently nominated for an Emmy Award for Outstanding Special Visual Effects In A Single Episode. 

 Themed entertainment 
Prior to opening its virtual production division, PXO previously had a themed entertainment division that produced digital walkthrough branded experiences, flying theater rides, immersive dome installations, digital dark ride media, and concert installations. Some of that work can be found in the New York's Times Square attraction, National Geographic Encounters, where PXO brought to life underwater ecosystems including 150 artificially intelligence-driven creatures ranging from sea lions to sharks to jellyfish via exclusive VR technology. PXO was part of the July 2018 launch of Warner Bros. World Abu Dhabi indoor theme park by working on five themed rides including the 4D flying theater experience, Green Lantern Galactic Odyssey. PXO partnered with rockband Aerosmith for their Las Vegas residency, Deuces Are Wild, which kicked off on April 6, 2019. Using never-before-seen visuals from Aerosmith's archives, PXO produced a 12-screen visual media presentation (including a 140-foot x 40-foot high-definition screen), complete with motion graphics, animations, stream of consciousness imagery and flashback moments of the band's colorful past. PXO also brought to life Aerosmith's infamous "wings" logo on stage, which unfolded to signal the band's arrival at the top of the show. Additionally, Pixomondo's 20-minute visual media pre-show took the audience through the band's historic journey, beginning with Woodstock all the way to the present, and included abstract imagery, as well as the iconic Aerosmith van. The company's work on Aerosmith's Las Vegas Residency earned PXO a 2019 Knight of Illumination Award (KOI-USA) nomination in the Best Concert Video Content category.

 Locations 
Currently, PXO has offices in the following locations:
 Los Angeles
 Frankfurt
 Stuttgart
 Toronto
 Vancouver
 Montreal
 London

 Filmography 
 Movies 

 2008: The Red Baron 2009: Das Vaterspiel 2009: Ninja Assassin 2009: 2012 2010: Devil's Kickers 2010: Percy Jackson & the Olympians: The Lightning Thief 2010: The Ghost Writer 2010: Iron Man 2 (additional visual effects)
 2010: The Losers 2010: A Nightmare on Elm Street 2010: The A-Team (pre-visualization)
 2010: Knight and Day (additional visual effects)
 2011: The Green Hornet 2011: The Rite 2011: Sucker Punch 2011: Fast Five 2011: Super 8 2011: Green Lantern 2011: Zookeeper 2011: Hugo 2011: Melancholia 2012: Dark Tide 2012: Yoko 2012: Wrath of the Titans 2012: The Amazing Spiderman 2012: Snow White & the Huntsman 2012: The Hunger Games 2012: Red Tails 2012: The Twilight Saga: Breaking Dawn – Part 2 2012: Raven the Little Rascal 2012: Journey 2: The Mysterious Island 2013: Men of the Emden 2013: Rush 2013: Fast & Furious 6 2013: After Earth 2013: Only Lovers Left Alive 2013: Beautiful Creatures 2013: Oblivion 2013: A Good Day to Die Hard 2013: Star Trek Into Darkness 2013: The Physician 2013: One Night Surprise 2014: A Most Wanted Man 2014: Pettersson und Findus – Kleiner Quälgeist, große Freundschaft 2014: The Breakup Guru 2014: Gone with the Bullets 2014: The Hunger Games: Mockingjay – Part 1 2014: Impossible 2015: Furious 7 2015: Wolf Totem 2015: Zhong Kui: Snow Girl and the Dark Crystal 2015: Fantastic Four 2015: Bridge of Spies 2016: Independence Day: Resurgence 2016: The Divergent Series: Allegiant 2016: Crouching Tiger, Hidden Dragon: Sword of Destiny 2016: Live By Night 2017: Wonder Woman 2017: Skyhunter 2017: Power Rangers 2017: The Girl in the Spider's Web 2017: The Dark Tower 2017: The Fate of the Furious 2018: Overlord 2018: Alpha 2018: Mary Poppins Returns 2018: Help, I Shrunk My Parents 2018: Goosebumps 2: Haunted Halloween 2018: Crazy Rich Asians 2019: A Dog's Way Home 2019: Pegasus 2019: Child's Play 2019: Midway 2019: Iron Sky: The Coming Race 2019: The Wandering Earth 2019: 4 Zauberhafte Schwestern 2019: Only Cloud Knows (Chinese Film) 2020: Sprite Sisters - Vier zauberhafte Schwestern 2020: The Way Back 2020: Lassie Come Home 2020: The Hunt 2020: Ich war noch niemals in New York (I've never been to New York) 2020: Berlin Alexanderplatz 2020: The King of Staten Island (2020 film) 2020: Greenland 2021: The Water Man
 2021: Without Remorse 2022: Moonfall 2022: Day Shift 2022: Spiderhead 2022: Matilda TV shows 

 2008: Fringe (season 1)
 2010: Outsourced 2010: Undercovers )
 2011: Terra Nova 2011: Hawaii Five-0 (season 2)
 2011: Grimm (season 1)
 2012: Revolution 2012: Go On 2012: The Mindy Project 2012–2019: Game of Thrones (from season 2 through season 8)
 2012: Mockingbird Lane (Pilot, show discontinued afterwards)
 2013: Da Vinci's Demons 2013-2014: Sleepy Hollow 2013: Bonnie & Clyde (miniseries)
 2014-2016: Marco Polo 2015: The Walking Dead 2015: Limitless 2015: Fear the Walking Dead 2015: Agents of S.H.I.E.L.D. 2016: Fargo 
 2016–2021: Goliath 2017–2022: The Orville 
 2017–present: Star Trek: Discovery 2017: Fear the Walking Dead 2018-2019: The Magicians 2018-2019: Counterpart 2018–present: Westworld 2018–present: Star Trek: Short Treks 2018: Siren 2019: Kim Possible (TV Movie) 2019: Euphoria 2019: The OA 2019–present: See 2019: For All Mankind 2019: Die Neue Zeit 2019–present: Carnival Row 
 2019-2020: The Mandalorian 2019: Watchmen 2019–present: The Boys 2020: Locke & Key 2020: Star Trek: Picard 2020–present: The Umbrella Academy 
 2020: Raised by Wolves 
 2020–present: Perry Mason 2020: The Stand 2021: Debris 2021: Lost in Space 
 2021: Station 11 2022: Winning Time: The Rise of the Lakers Dynasty 2022: Halo 2022: Love and Death 2022: Star Trek: Strange New Worlds 2022: House of the Dragon 2022: Archive 81 2022: Upload TV productions 

 2005: Atlantropa - Der Traum vom neuen Kontinent 2009: Vulkan 2009: Crashpoint - 90 Minuten bis zum Absturz 2010: Terra X: Supertiere 2011: Hindenburg 2012: Terra X: Supertiere 2 2013: Terra X: Supertiere 3 2013: Helden – Wenn dein Land dich braucht''

Awards and nominations
The following list of awards and nominations for Pixomondo lists accolades that have been presented to a team containing at least one employee of Pixomondo.

References

External links

Fastcompany Profile

Visual effects companies
American animation studios
Mass media companies established in 2000
Sony Pictures Entertainment
2022 mergers and acquisitions